Jackson Market, also known as Jackson Bazaar, is a flea market located in Keamari, Karachi. It is known as a marketplace of second-hand goods and is popular among lower-middle class of Karachi. It is also sometimes called black market because of smuggled goods sold there.

History
It was founded around 1982 as a marketplace and used to sold second-hand appliances from ships only. The shops now also sell smuggled goods along with reconditioned equipment.

Previously, it was known as cheap-as-chips goods market.

References

1982 establishments in Pakistan
Bazaars in Karachi
Black markets
Flea markets